A by-election was held in the Dáil Éireann Dublin Mid-West constituency in Ireland on Friday, 29 November 2019, to fill the vacancy left by the election of Fine Gael TD Frances Fitzgerald to the European Parliament.

It was held on the same day as three other by-elections in Cork North-Central, Dublin Fingal and Wexford. The Electoral (Amendment) Act 2011 stipulates that a by-election in Ireland must be held within six months of a vacancy occurring. The by-election writ was moved in the Dáil on 7 November 2019.

At the 2016 general election, the electorate of Dublin Mid-West was 69,388, and the constituency elected one Sinn Féin TD, one Fine Gael TD, one Fianna Fáil TD, and one AAA–PBP TD.

The election was won by South Dublin County Councillor Mark Ward of Sinn Féin. Lisa Colman was co-opted to Ward's seat on South Dublin County Council following his election to the Dáil.

Among the candidates were 7 South Dublin County Councillors; Paul Gogarty, Emer Higgins, Peter Kavanagh, Shane Moynihan, Francis Timmons, Joanna Tuffy and Mark Ward and former South Dublin County Councillor Ruth Nolan.

This was the first occasion when by-elections were contested by Independents 4 Change (who also contested Dublin Fingal) and the Social Democrats (who also contested Cork North-Central and Dublin Fingal).

Result

See also
List of Dáil by-elections
Dáil constituencies

References

External links
Dublin County returning officer 

2019 Dublin Mid-West by-election
2019 in Irish politics
32nd Dáil
By-elections in the Republic of Ireland
By-elections in County Dublin
November 2019 events in Ireland